Troth Yeddha' is the name of the prominent ridge on which the University of Alaska Fairbanks is currently located. In February 2013, the US Board of Geographic Names approved the University supported proposal to officially rename the ridge.

The name is derived from the Lower Tanana Athabascan words troth, meaning 'Indian potato' or 'wild potato' (Hedysarum alpinum) and yeddha, meaning 'ridge'.

The 2200 acre east-west trending ridge has had no official name. Portions of the ridge are referred to unofficially in English as 'College Hill' or 'University Ridge'.

The name Troth Yeddha' is one of a suite of Lower Tanana place names in the university area reflecting the base troth. These include:
 Tr'exwghodegi Troth Yeddha' Bena''' – Smith Lake (literally: 'upper wild potato ridge lake')
 Tr'exwghotthigi Troth Yeddha' Bena – Ballaine Lake (literally: 'lower wild potato ridge lake')
 Troth Ghotthiit'' – Geist Road - Fairbanks Street area (literally: 'toward the water from Indian potato')

In 2008 the University of Alaska Fairbanks dedicated the land between the Museum of the North and the Reichart Building as Troth Yeddha' Park. A design for the park is being developed.

References

External links
 Alaska Native Language Center  Troth Yeddha' page 
 Troth Yeddha' in the University of Alaska Fairbanks Catalog
 Official GNIS Name Entry

Landforms of Fairbanks North Star Borough, Alaska
University of Alaska Fairbanks
Ridges of Alaska